Abu-l-Hasan Ali may refer to:

 Abu-l-Hasan Ali (Hafsid prince) (d. 1352), rebel Hafsid prince during the reign of Abu 'Amr 'Uthman
 Abu'l-Hasan Ali of Granada (d. 1485), twenty-first ruler of the Emirate of Granada
 Abul Hasan Ali Hasani Nadwi (1913—1999), Indian Islamic scholar